The 2019–20 Atlas F.C. season is the 90th season in the football club's history and the 50th consecutive season in the top flight of Mexican football.

Coaching staff

Transfers

In

Out

Competitions

Overview

Torneo Apertura

League table

Results summary

Result round by round

Matches

Copa MX

Group stage

Statistics

Squad statistics

Goals

Clean sheets

Disciplinary record

References

External links

Mexican football clubs 2019–20 season
Atlas F.C. seasons